"Brand New Day" is a song by Dublin-based alternative rock quartet Kodaline. The song was released as a digital download on 23 August 2013, as the third single from their debut studio album In a Perfect World (2013). The song peaked at number 29 on the Irish Singles Chart and number 75 on the UK Singles Chart. Brand New Day was used as the theme tune to the crime drama TV series Lie To Me.

Music video
A music video to accompany the release of "Brand New Day" was first released onto YouTube on 7 August 2013 at a total length of three minutes and thirty-two seconds.

Track listing

Chart performance

Weekly charts

Release history

References

2013 singles
Kodaline songs
2013 songs